Big Brother Canada 10 is the tenth season of the Canadian reality television series Big Brother Canada. The series began filming on February 26, 2022 and premiered on March 2, 2022, on Global. Hosted by Arisa Cox, the show revolved around sixteen contestants (known as HouseGuests), who volunteered to reside in a house under constant surveillance and without any communication with the outside world as they compete to win a grand prize of CA$100,000.

The season concluded on May 5, 2022 after running for 69 days. It was won by Kevin Jacobs, who defeated Josh Nash in a final 8-1 jury vote. Meanwhile, Marty Frenette won an online vote to become this season's Canada's Favourite HouseGuest. The finale of the season was watched by 835 thousand viewers.

Production

Development 
The tenth season was produced by Insight Productions, in association with Corus Entertainment and Banijay. The season was first announced on July 6, 2021, at the Corus upfronts for the 2021–22 Canadian network television schedule. Arisa Cox continued as the host and as an executive producer for this season. Casting began on July 14, 2021, with Kassting Inc. returning to cast for the season. Due to restrictions stemming from the COVID-19 pandemic, no in-person casting calls were held. Casting closed on November 19, 2021, with the final cast being revealed on February 23, 2022.

Expedia, Wendy's and Muskoka Spirits returned to sponsor the season. Additionally, the show has three new sponsors: Winners, Belairdirect insurance and Philips Sonicare Oral Care.

Prizes 
The winner of the series, determined by the previously evicted HouseGuests, wins CA$100,000 in cash along with CA$10,000 in clothing from Winners, and a Holiday from Expedia while the runner-up receives CA$20,000. The HouseGuest selected as Canada's Favourite HouseGuest receives $10,000. Several other prizes were given out throughout the season.

Production design 

On February 22, 2022, Global released images of the new kitchen, dining area and a then-unknown room which featured a gold phone. More images of the house were released on March 1, 2022, with a full house tour being released the following day.

In the house tour, it was revealed this season's house was built to simulate the theme of game shows and to give way for twists and tasks as seen in the numerous mystery doors that line the house. According to host Arisa Cox, it took 22,000 man hours to design and assemble the season's house. 

The lounge area features a wheel used to select players for the PoV competition, with the archway to the backyard displaying an eye with a dollar symbol ($) on its pupil. The house's pantry features a showcase of several items called the "Sloppers Showcase", which was used as the subject for the Week 4 HoH competition. The pantry also houses a Wendy's delivery window, in which the HoH receives advice from past winners, along with their a for themselves, and a HouseGuest of their choice.  The HoH room features designs inspired by the trends of the 70s with the two regular bedrooms being decorated with dollar symbols and question marks (?).

International broadcast
Big Brother Canada was made available to stream in Australia on 7Plus. The first 8 episodes were made available on March 31, with further episodes airing weekly.

HouseGuests 

The HouseGuests' images and profiles were released on Wednesday, February 23, 2022. Prior to the full reveal, the images of the HouseGuests were revealed in a series of adverts for the season. The HouseGuests moved into the house on February 26, more than a week before the premiere.

Guests
As the show's "milestone" tenth season, an unprecedented number of HouseGuests (including all past winners) from previous seasons made an appearance on the season.

Format 
Big Brother Canada follows a group of contestants, known as HouseGuests who move into a custom-built house outfitted with cameras and microphones, recording their every move 24 hours a day. The HouseGuests are sequestered in the Big Brother Canada House with no contact with the outside world. During their stay, the HouseGuests share their thoughts on events and other HouseGuests inside a private room referred to as the Diary Room. At the start of each week in the house, the HouseGuests compete for the title of Head of Household, often shortened to simply HoH. The winner of the HoH competition is immune from eviction and will name two HouseGuests to be nominated for eviction. After the nominees are determined, the Power of Veto competition is played. Five players will compete in the competition: the two nominees and three random players, with the winner receiving the Power of Veto. If a HouseGuest chooses to exercise the Power of Veto, the Head of Household is obligated to name a replacement nominee. The holder of the Power of Veto is safe from being nominated as the replacement nominee. On eviction night, all HouseGuests must vote to evict one of the nominees, with the exception of the nominees and the Head of Household. The eviction vote is by secret ballot, with HouseGuests casting their votes orally in the Diary Room. In the event of a tied vote, the Head of Household will cast a tie-breaking vote publicly. The nominee with the majority of the votes is evicted from the house. Midway through the season, the evicted HouseGuests go on to become members of the "jury"; the jury is responsible for choosing who wins the series. The final Head of Household competition is split into three parts; the winners of the first two rounds compete in the third and final round. Once only two HouseGuests remain, the members of the jury cast their votes for who should win the series.

Twists

Phone Room 
Room 5 features a gold phone that rang occasionally throughout the season.  
On Day 1, Jay was the first to answer the phone and as a result they received immunity for the week. 
On Day 26, the number to the phone was "leaked" and was subject to calls that would challenge the HouseGuests to complete various tasks. As a reward for answering the calls, the HouseGuests received a stocked pantry and the Household was relieved of their slop punishment.
On Day 44, Jacey-Lynne found a clue to call a number through the phone, leading her on a hunt throughout the House, and ultimately finding a Secret Power of Veto.

Belairdirect Eviction Protection Insurance 
Occasionally throughout the season, Immunity would be awarded to HouseGuest by various means. This immunity was sponsored by BelAirDirect 
On Day 1, in the Final Round of the First HoH competition, 2 of the 3 doors would award the door's holder immunity (the third had the HoH title). Moose and Josh each won immunity for the week.
On Day 13, it was announced that the viewers would be voting to decide which HouseGuest would receive immunity from nominations for Week 3. The voter may vote for multiple HouseGuests with no vote limits being imposed. Marty received the most votes and received the immunity.
On Day 48, it was announced that the viewers would be voting to decide which HouseGuest would receive immunity from nominations for Week 8. The voter may vote for multiple HouseGuests with no vote limits being imposed. As a result of winning the last Belairdirect Eviction Protection Insurance, Marty was ineligible to be voted for the immunity. Summer received the most votes and was made immune.

Chain of Safety Double Eviction 
Week 5 featured a Double Eviction, in which two HouseGuests were evicted on the same night. Unlike a typical Double Eviction (in which the regular game format is played over the course of the night), the second eviction was determined by a "Chain of Safety" selection process. Beginning with Moose, who won that night's first challenge, each HouseGuest would select another HouseGuest to save until three are left unselected, who would then compete for safety in a second challenge to determine that night's second set of nominees.

Below is the full selection order for the safety chain selection.

Canada's Jury Vote 
In the penultimate episode for the season, it was announced that Canada would join the jury as its ninth and final member. The recipient of the vote was determined by an online vote held prior to the finale which was exclusive to Canadian residents unlike in previous online votes. Arisa would cast the vote on Canada's behalf, and it was revealed to be cast for Kevin.

Summary

Episodes

Have-Nots 
Occasionally, a group of HouseGuests are selected to be Have-Nots for a certain week. Those selected to be a Have-Not would be restricted to a slop diet and cold showers. There was no official Have-Not room for this season. There were no official Have-Nots for the entire pre-jury phase of the season. Although the entire house was put on slop for weeks 4 and 5, no official Have-Nots were named. In week 7, those who failed to obtain a "Have" card in the HoH competition were automatically made Have-nots, with the exception of Gino, who was granted "have" rights by virtue of being the HoH.

Voting history

Notes 

 :  On Night 1, Jay answered Big Brother's Phone, awarding them immunity for the week. As a result, they did not compete in that night's HOH competition.
 :  For winning each of the 3 heats in the first HOH competition, Hermon, Moose, and Josh each earned the chance to win HOH through a random choice of 3 doors. Hermon won HOH, while Moose and Josh each won immunity for the week.
 :  Following the Week 2 and Week 7 evictions, Canada voted for a Houseguest to receive immunity for the following week. Any previous winners were not eligible a second time. Marty was voted to be immune for Week 3 and Summer was voted to be immune for Week 8.
 : This week featured a Chain of Safety Double Eviction. Following the regular eviction, the remaining HouseGuests participated in a Competition followed by the Chain of Safety Ceremony to determine the night's nominees. At the Chain of Safety Ceremony, the Housemates participated in a selection process to determine the nominees. Beginning with the Competition winner, (indicated by ), each HouseGuest would select another HouseGuest to be safe until three remained. The three HouseGuests left unselected competed in the second challenge, with the winner (indicated by  ) being safe. The two remaining HouseGuests were the final nominees, and faced the House’s Vote.
:  During Week 7, a Secret PoV was hidden in the house. The winner could remove a nominee only at the Week 7 Veto Ceremony. Jacey-Lynne found the Secret POV, and chose not to use it.
: This week featured a Triple Eviction. Following the regular eviction, the remaining HouseGuests played a modified week's worth of games, including HoH and Veto competitions and their respective ceremonies during the remainder of the live show, culminating in a second eviction that evicted two HouseGuests. The Head of Household was obliged to nominate three HouseGuests for eviction and the voting HouseGuests would vote to save (indicated by ) rather than to evict, with the HouseGuest with the most votes to save being the sole nominee surviving the vote for that cycle.
: The Jury voted to crown the winner of Big Brother Canada 10.
:  As part of a twist, Canada would join the jury as its ninth jury member. The recipient of the vote would be determined by an online vote, with the vote itself being cast and revealed by Arisa on behalf of Canada.

Reception

Critical reception 
The season was generally well received by critics and viewers, with many praising the cast and the gameplay of the eventual winner Kevin Jacobs. Justin Carrerio of The Young Folks praised the season, commenting that Big Brother Canada 10 delivered an exciting and fun season that kept us on our toes, and its finale ended the season on a high. In a review published prior to the season finale, Lee Whitten of ScreenRant commented that the season has been near-perfect.

Viewing figures

References

Notes

External links 
Global official site

2022 Canadian television seasons
Big Brother Canada seasons